The following lists events that happened during 2005 in Georgia.

Incumbents
President of Georgia: Mikheil Saakashvili (25 January 2004 – 25 November 2007)
Prime Minister: Zurab Zhvania (February 17, 2004 -February 3, 2005); Mikheil Saakashvili (acting; February 3, 2005 - February 17, 2005); Zurab Noghaideli (February 17, 2005 – November 16, 2007)
Chairperson of the Parliament: Nino Burjanadze (April 22, 2004 – June 7, 2008)

Important persons
Died:

 Zurab Zhvania, fourth prime minister of Georgia

Events

January to June
 January 12: Sergei Bagapsh became president of Abkhazia AR
 January 28: United Nations Security Council Resolution 1582

July to December
 July 29: United Nations Security Council Resolution 1615

 12 October: National football of Georgia took 6th place in 2006 Fifa world cup qualifiers (see 2006 FIFA World Cup qualification – UEFA Group 2
 30 October: Men's rugby team of Georgia took third place in final standings at Europe Nations Cup (see 2005 European Nations Cup)

?
 Founded political party European Democrats
 Founded Supreme Court of Georgia (country)

References

 
Georgia
Georgia
Georgia